Romuald Chojnacki (born 6 February 1950) is a Polish footballer. He played in two matches for the Poland national football team in 1974.

References

External links
 

1950 births
Living people
Polish footballers
Poland international footballers
Sportspeople from Częstochowa
Association football midfielders
Skra Częstochowa players
Polonia Bytom players
Ruch Chorzów players
Lech Poznań players
Angoulême Charente FC players
AS Cherbourg Football players
Polish expatriate footballers
Expatriate footballers in France